Thomas George Trethewey (born May 8, 1944) is an American former competition swimmer.

Trethewey was born in Gary, Indiana.  He trained with coach George Haines of the Santa Clara Swim Club.  He later attended Indiana University, where he swam for coach Doc Counsilman's Indiana Hoosiers swimming and diving team in National Collegiate Athletic Association (NCAA) competition from 1963 to 1965.

Trethewey represented the United States at the 1964 Summer Olympics in Tokyo.  He competed in the semifinals of the men's 200-meter breaststroke, recording the ninth-best overall time of 2:34.5.

See also
 List of Indiana University (Bloomington) people

References

External links

  Tom Trethewey – Olympic athlete profile at Sports-Reference.com

1944 births
Living people
American male breaststroke swimmers
Indiana Hoosiers men's swimmers
Olympic swimmers of the United States
Sportspeople from Gary, Indiana
Swimmers at the 1964 Summer Olympics